Waupaca Railroad Depot originally called the Wisconsin Central Depot a/k/a Soo Line Depot. was built in 1907 for the Wisconsin Central Railway and is located in Waupaca, Wisconsin. The former Soo Line Railroad depot is one of Waupaca's historical landmarks. The building was purchased by the Waupaca Historical Society in 2004, and restoration of the building and site began. In 1998 the building's site was recognized by the Wisconsin Historical Society.

History
The depot was built in 1907 by the Wisconsin Central Railway. The Soo Line Railroad leased the depot. In the early 1900s the depot helped Waupaca, Wisconsin become a center of the potato industry.

Passenger train service to the Waupaca station ended on January 15, 1965, when the Soo Line Laker between Chicago and the Twin Cities or Duluth was discontinued.  

In 2019 it was reported that a filmmaker was developing a documentary of the restoration process.

Architectural elements
The building is one story with a stone foundation. The building was constructed with sandstone. The roof is covered with tiles. The total area of the building is 27x70. There is a granite exterior with an cantilevered roof overhang.

References

External links
Livestream from the Waupaca Railroad Depot
City of Waupaca Historic Preservation

Historic sites in Wisconsin
1907 establishments in Wisconsin
Historic American Buildings Survey in Wisconsin
1900s architecture in the United States
Waupaca
Railway stations in the United States opened in 1907
Former railway stations in Wisconsin
Railway stations closed in 1965